Chârost is a commune in the Cher department in the Centre-Val de Loire region of France.

Geography
The commune lies on the pilgrimage route known as St. James' Way.

Population

Sights
 The church of St. Michel, dating from the nineteenth century.
 The fifteenth-century chateau.
 Wayside stone crosses.
 Traces of an eleventh-century castle donjon.

See also
Communes of the Cher department

References

Communes of Cher (department)